Lorca-Sutullena railway station is a station in Lorca, Spain. It was damaged in the 2011 Lorca earthquake.

It is primarily served by Cercanías Murcia/Alicante line  C-2.

Services

References

Railway stations in the Region of Murcia
Lorca, Spain